Sandrine Dogor-Such (born November 8, 1970) is a French politician of the National Rally who has been a Member of the National Assembly for Pyrénées-Orientales's 3rd constituency since 2022.

She is also one of the deputy mayors of Perpignan.

Dogor-Such worked for a pharmaceuticals company before entering politics. She contested Pyrénées-Orientales's 3rd constituency during the 2017 French legislative election, but lost to Laurence Gayte of LREM. During the 2022 French legislative election, she was selected to run in the same constituency and took the seat in the second round, defeating Natalie Cullell of La France insoumise. During her campaign, she voiced opposition to mandatory vaccination policies in the workplace and supported reintegrating healthcare workers who were removed from their jobs over vaccine disputes.

References 

1970 births
Living people
Deputies of the 16th National Assembly of the French Fifth Republic
21st-century French politicians
21st-century French women politicians
Women members of the National Assembly (France)
National Rally (France) politicians